The West of Shetland Pipeline (WOSP) is a pipeline system which transports natural gas from three offshore fields in the West of Shetland area to Sullom Voe Terminal in the Shetland Isles of Scotland.

West of Shetland area
The West of Shetland area is a region in the northern Atlantic Ocean, where there are currently three developed offshore fields; Schiehallion, Foinaven and Clair. A number of further hydrocarbon discoveries have been made in the area, but these are not currently considered to be economic due to the high costs of development. The Laggan-Tormore and Rosebank-Lochnagar discoveries are in the process of being further appraised for development, but the WOSP is considered to be unable to carry the additional gas production from these fields.

Ownership
WOSP is owned collectively by the owners of the Schiehallion, Loyal, Foinaven and East Foinaven fields; each owner company holds divided capacity rights in accordance with its ownership interest. It is operated by BP.

Technical description

Natural gas from the Clair field is delivered into the pipeline at the Clair tee midway along the pipeline  from Sullom Voe.

Natural gas from WOSP is further transported by East of Shetland Pipeline (EOSP), NLGP and FLAGS/SEGAL systems for the delivery into the UK National Transmission System at St Fergus in the northeast of Scotland, and for the delivery of separated natural gas liquids into either the Shell operated SEGAL system or the onshore section of the BP-operated Forties pipeline system. The gas delivered from the pipeline is also part of the Magnus oilfield enhanced oil recovery scheme where gas and natural gas liquids are piped to the Magnus platform and injected into the reservoir to increase the recoverable reserves from the development.

References

BP buildings and structures
Natural gas pipelines in the United Kingdom
Pipelines under the North Sea
Oil and gas industry in Shetland
West of Shetland